The 2015 Hungaroring GP2 Series round was a GP2 Series motor race held on 24 and 26 July 2015 at the Hungaroring in Mogyoród, Pest, Hungary. It was the sixth round of the 2015 GP2 Series. The race weekend supported the 2015 Hungarian Grand Prix.

Classification

Qualifying

Feature Race

Sprint Race

See also 
 2015 Hungarian Grand Prix
 2015 Hungaroring GP3 Series round

References

External links 
 Official website of GP2 Series

Hungaroring
GP2